(born November 22, 1965) is a Japanese stunt man and suit actor affiliated with Japan Action Enterprises. He has been cast mainly in the Super Sentai series.

Stunt/Suit Actor Roles

Super Sentai Series
Hikari Sentai Maskman (1987-1988) - Black Mask
Choujuu Sentai Liveman (1988-1989) - Green Sai
Choujin Sentai Jetman (1991-1992) - Black Condor
Kyoryu Sentai Zyuranger (1992-1993) - Mammoth Ranger
Chōriki Sentai Ohranger (1995-1996) - Oh Green (sub), Green Blocker (sub)
Kyuukyuu Sentai GoGoFive (1999-2000) - Go Blue (sub), Saima Beasts
Mirai Sentai Timeranger (2000-2001) - Time Fire, Gien
Hyakujuu Sentai Gaoranger (2001-2002) - Gao Blue
Ninpuu Sentai Hurricaneger (2002-2003) - Kuwaga Raiger, Megatagame
Bakuryuu Sentai Abaranger (2003-2004) - Abare Killer, Yatsudenwani
Tokusou Sentai Dekaranger (2004-2005) - Deka Blue, Deka Wing Robo
Mahou Sentai Magiranger (2005-2006) - Magi Yellow, Magi Garuda, Legend Magi Yellow
GoGo Sentai Boukenger (2006-2007) - Bouken Black
Juken Sentai Gekiranger (2007-2008) - Black Lion Rio, Bion Biao
Engine Sentai Go-onger (2008-2009) - Go-on Black
Tensou Sentai Goseiger (2010-2011) - Gosei Black (sub)
Kaizoku Sentai Gokaiger (2011-2012) - Action Commander, Black Lion Rio, Babatcheed
Doubutsu Sentai Zyuohger (2016-2017) - Zyuoh Bird
Uchu Sentai Kyuranger (2017-2018) - Sasori Orange

Kamen Rider Series
Kamen Rider Gaim (2013-2014) - Kamen Rider Kurokage, Kamen Rider Bravo
Kamen Rider Drive (2014-2015) - Kamen Rider Chaser, Mashin Chaser, Kamen Rider Protodrive
Kamen Rider Revice (2021-2022) - Rex Deadman, True Gifftarian, Giff

Films
Super Hero Taisen GP: Kamen Rider 3 (2015) - Kamen Rider Black, Mashin Chaser

Non Suit Actor Roles
Kamen Rider Den-O (2007-2008) - Contact Holder (episode 31)
Hyakujuu Sentai Gaoranger (2001-2002) - Man in the background (episode 51)
Ninpuu Sentai Hurricaneger (2002-2003) - Man in the background (episode 51)

References

External links 
 

1965 births
Living people